Deutsche Schule der Borromäerinnen may refer to:

Deutsche Schule der Borromäerinnen Kairo (German International School of Cairo)
Deutsche Schule der Borromäerinnen Alexandria